Donja Oraovica is a village in central Croatia, in the municipality of Dvor, Sisak-Moslavina County.

Demographics
According to the 2011 census, the village of Donja Oraovica 
has 41 inhabitants. This represents 22.78% of its pre-war population according to the 1991 census.

The 1991 census recorded that 98.33% of the village population were ethnic Serbs (177/180),  0.55% were ethnic Croats (1/180), 0.55% were Yugoslavs (1/180) and 0.55% were of other/unknown ethnic origin (1/180).

References

Populated places in Sisak-Moslavina County
Serb communities in Croatia